Women as Lovers is the sixth studio album by American avant-garde band Xiu Xiu. It was released on January 29, 2008, by Kill Rock Stars, and shares its title with the Martin Chalmers translation of Elfriede Jelinek's 1975 novel Die Liebhaberinnen.

Prior to its release, the album was reported to be "more approachable or communicative on a basic human level" than anything else the band has released. The first track, "I Do What I Want When I Want", was released on December 11 via Pitchfork Media's "Forkcast", and is also available free of charge from Kill Rock Stars' webstore.

The release through the iTunes Store includes seven exclusive bonus tracks, whilst 500 limited edition copies were packaged with a DVD called "What's Your Problem?", containing four tour films, 100 photos, and sixteen music videos.

Track listing 
All songs are written by Xiu Xiu, except "Under Pressure" written by Queen and David Bowie. "You Are Pregnant You, You Are Dead" contains additional lyrics by Angela Seo.

References

External links 
 Amazon.com listing

2008 albums
Xiu Xiu albums
Kill Rock Stars albums